KMOE (92.1 FM, "The Bullet") is an American radio station licensed to serve the community of Butler, Missouri. The station's broadcast license is held by Bates County Broadcasting Company.

KMOE has been owned and operated by members of the Thornton family since it was founded in 1975. The station was assigned the call sign "KMAM" by the Federal Communications Commission (FCC).

Programming
KMOE broadcasts a full service country music format, including programming from Citadel Media, in simulcast with sister station KMAM (1530 AM). In addition to its music programming, KMOE airs local news, farm and market reports, ABC News Radio, a daily obituary report, and a tradio program called Swap Shop. Sunday programming includes Gospel music, local church services, Gun Talk Radio, plus news and sports updates.

References

External links
 KMOE official website
Facebook Page
 

MOE
Country radio stations in the United States
Radio stations established in 1975
Bates County, Missouri